Mount Mercy Academy is a private, Roman Catholic high school in Buffalo, New York within the Diocese of Buffalo.

Background
Mount Mercy Academy was established in 1904 by the Sisters of Mercy.

Academics
In 2018, Mount Mercy Academy was ranked 9th out of 135 Western New York high schools in terms of academic performance.

Athletics
Cross Country
Soccer
Volleyball
Golf
Basketball
Softball
Lacrosse
Tennis
Track and Field
Bowling
Cheerleading
Ice Hockey
Rowing/Crew

Student organizations
Art Club
Anti-Bullying Society
Drama Club
Environmental Awareness Club
Foreign Language Club
Madrigal Art and Literary Calendar
Magic Belles
McAuley Scholars
Mercienne (Yearbook)
Merciette (School Newspaper)
Mercy Speaks
Mock Trial
Model UN
National Honor Society
Oratory and Debate
Pure Magic
Students Against Destructive Decisions (S.A.D.D.)
Ski Club
Student Ambassadors
Student Government
Student Relations Board

References

External links
 School Website

Catholic secondary schools in New York (state)
Educational institutions established in 1904
Girls' schools in New York (state)
Roman Catholic Diocese of Buffalo
High schools in Buffalo, New York
1904 establishments in New York (state)